Irish syntax is rather different from that of most Indo-European languages, especially because of its VSO word order.

Normal word order
The normal word order in an Irish sentence is:
Preverbal particle
Verb
Subject
Direct object or predicate adjective
Indirect object
Location descriptor
Manner descriptor
Time descriptor

Only the verb and subject are obligatory; all other parts are optional (unless the primary or finite verb is transitive, in which case a direct object is required). In synthetic verb forms, the verb and subject are united in a single word, so that even one-word sentences are possible, e.g.  "I understand."

An example sentence:

Questions and answers
Irish has no words for "yes" and "no". The answer to a question contains a repetition (the same as in Latin) of the verb, either with or without a negative particle. For analytic forms, only the verb is given and the subject is not repeated. If a verb has different dependent and independent forms, the dependent form follows the interrogative or negative particle. The independent form is used where there is no particle.

CNJV:conjunctive
DSJV:disjunctive

Commands
In a command the imperative mood is used, and no subject is given.

To express a negative command, the particle  is used. This particle, which can be roughly translated "don't", causes neither eclipsis nor lenition, and attaches h to a following vowel.

Syntax of the verbal noun
A progressive aspect can be formed by connecting the verbal noun to the existential verb with the progressive particle .

 
The object of a verbal noun is in the genitive, if it is definite.

 
If a nonfinite clause forms the complement of the verb, the verbal noun stands alone (without a preposition) in the clause.

The direct object of a verbal noun complement precedes the verbal noun; the leniting particle  "to" is placed between them. Other complements follow.

Object pronouns
Generally, an object pronoun or a conjugated preposition stands at the end of a sentence in Irish. Compare this sentence:

with the two following sentences:

Passive
Irish commonly uses the impersonal form (also called the autonomous form) instead of the passive voice.

In the perfect, the passive voice is formed by using the passive participle with the existential verb.

Stative verbs
Some verbs describing the state or condition of a person form a progressive present with the existential verb plus 'in (my, your, his etc.)' plus the verbal noun.

Forms meaning "to be"
Irish, like Spanish and other languages, has two forms that can express the English verb "to be". The two forms perform different grammatical functions.

Existential verb 
It is an irregular verb; see Irish verbs for its conjugation.

Existence, condition or location
This verb expresses the absolute existence of something, its condition, or its location. When accompanied by the adverb  "there", it means "exist" or "there is/are". Otherwise, the verb is complemented by an adjective, an adverb or a prepositional phrase.

Definitions
A noun phrase alone cannot form the predicate of the existential verb. Instead, the noun complement is preceded by a form meaning "in my, in your, in his", etc.

The copula 
The Irish copula is not a verb but a particle, used to express a definition or identification. It may be complemented by a noun, a pronoun, an adjective, or a topicalized phrase. Because it is not a verb, it does not inflect for person or number, and pronouns appear in the disjunctive form.

The copula, which has the realis form , is used for identification and definition:

Definition: X is a Y. Here, the word order is "Is-Y-(pronoun)-X". X is a definite noun or a pronoun.

Identification: X is the Y. Here the word order is "Is-pronoun-X-Y", or "Is-pronoun-Y-X". There must always be a pronoun between a definite noun and the copula. It would be wrong to say *Is Seán an múinteoir, which would mean "The teacher is a Seán".

To identify a first or second person pronoun with a definite noun, it is usual to use the longer form of the personal pronoun, which comes immediately after the copula:
(26a)  "I am the teacher."
(26b)  "You are the student."
(26c)  "We are the teachers."
(26d)  "You are the students."

The long form of the personal pronoun is very emphatic and stressed and often ejects the copula entirely. Thus, in the previous four examples, it is possible to leave out the copula, which will then be understood: 
(27a) 
(27b) 
(27c) 
(27d) 

If a third-person pronoun with a definite noun is identified, the same construction may be used:
(28a)  "He is the teacher."
(28b)  "She is the student."
(28c)  "They are the soldiers".
However, in the third person, that is perceived to be much more emphatic than in the first and second persons. The usual way to say "He is the teacher" is
(28d) 
in which the definite noun is flanked by two personal pronouns agreeing with it in gender and number.

(29a)  "This is my mother."
(29b)  "That's the teacher."

One can also add "that is in him/her/it", especially when an adjective is used if one wants to emphasise the quality: 

That sometimes appears in Hiberno-English, translated literally as "that is in it" or as "so it is".

The present tense of the copula can be used for the future:
(32)  "He will be a teacher."

The past tense of the copula can be used for the conditional:
(33)  "She would be a teacher."

(34a)  "Are you a teacher?"
(34b)  "We were not teachers."

If the predicate is definite, the copula is followed by a disjunctive personal pronoun, which may be repeated at the end of the sentence.
(35a)  "Siobhán is the teacher."
(35b)  "Those people are the teachers."
(35c)  "He is the teacher."

If the predicate is indefinite, it follows the copula directly, with the disjunctive pronoun and subject coming at the end.
(36a)  "I am a student."
(36b)  "Cáit is a teacher."

The copula can also be used to stress an adjective, as in the following instance:

Topicalization
Topicalization in Irish is formed by clefting: by fronting the topicalized element as the predicate of the copula, while the rest of the sentence becomes a relative clause. Compare  "I said it" with  "I said it."

Other uses for the copula
There are other set idiomatic phrases using the copula, as seen in the following examples. Here the predicate consists mostly of either a prepositional phrase or an adjective.
(38a)  "I like" (lit. "is good with me")
(38b)  "I would like" (lit. "would be good with me")
(38c)  "I prefer" (lit. "is better with me")
(38d)  "I can" (lit. "is possible with me")
(38e)  "one should" (lit. "would be right")
(38f)  "one shouldn't" (lit. "would not be right")
(38g)  "I hate" (lit. "is hatred with me")
(38h)  "I don't care" (lit. "is indifferent with me")
(38i)  "I wish/would like" (lit. "is desire with me")
(38j)  "I remember" (lit. "is memory with me")

There are also the following constructions:

Answering questions with copula
Since the copula cannot stand alone, the answer must contain either a part of the predicate or a pronoun, both of which follow the copula.
(42)  "Is Seán the teacher?"
(42.1)  "Yes, he is."
(42.2)  "No, he isn't."
(43)  "Is Seán a teacher?"
(43.1)  "Yes, he is."
(43.2)  "No, he isn't."

Omission of 
In all dialects, the copula  may be omitted if the predicate is a noun. ( cannot be deleted.) If  is omitted, the following  preceding the noun is omitted as well.
(44a)  "I am the teacher."
(44b)  "Seán is the teacher."
(44c)  "I am a student."

Comparison of the existential verb and the copula
Both the existential verb and the copula may take a nominal predicate, but the two constructions have slightly different meanings:  sounds more permanent: it represents something absolute about Seán; it is a permanent characteristic of Seán that he is a doctor. That is known as an individual-level predicate. In the sentence , one says rather that Seán performs the job of a doctor, he is a doctor at the moment, or he has become a doctor. That is known as a stage-level predicate.

Subordination
Most complementizers (subordinating conjunctions) in Irish cause eclipsis and require the dependent form of irregular verbs. The word order in an Irish subordinate clause is the same as in a main clause. The types of subordination discussed here are: complementation, relative clauses, and wh-questions (which are formed as a kind of relative clause in Irish).

Complementation

Syntactic complementation
The subordinate clause is a part of the main clause in a purely syntactic complementation. In Irish it is introduced by  "that" in the positive and  "that... not" in the negative.

Other examples of complex sentences using complementizers:
(47a)  "People were afraid of him because he was quick-tempered."
(47b)  "I don't believe it although I see it."
(47c)  "She wrote it down so that she wouldn't forget it."
(47d)  "Wait until he comes."

Conditional complementation
A conditional clause gives the condition under which something will happen. In Irish there are two kinds of conditional clauses, depending on the plausibility of the condition. The particle  introduces a conditional clause that is plausible, also called a realis condition.  causes lenition and takes the independent form of irregular verbs.

If the condition of the clause is hypothetical, also called an irrealis condition or counterfactual conditional, the word  is used, which causes eclipsis and takes the dependent form of irregular verbs. The verb in both clauses is in the conditional.
(48a)  "If he believes that story, he is pretty gullible." (realis)
(48b)  "If he didn't lose it, then he stole it." (realis)
(48c)  "If I left it to you, you wouldn't do it." (irrealis)

Other examples of conditionals are: 
(49a)  "The venture will succeed provided that all take part in it."
(49b)  "You may break it provided that you pay for it."

Relative clauses

Direct relative
There are two kinds of relative clauses in Irish: direct and indirect. Direct relative clauses begin with the leniting relativizer  and the independent form of an irregular verb is used. The direct relative is used when the relative pronoun is the subject or direct object of its clause.
(50a)  "The people who were unhappy went overseas."
(50b)  "That's the work that I did."

The direct relative is also used in topicalizations, e.g.:
(51)  "It's Jimmy who went to America."

The direct relative is also used after the word  "time":
(52)  "the first time that I was there"

Indirect relative
Indirect relative clauses begin with the eclipsing relativizer  (in the preterite with leniting ); the dependent form of an irregular verb is used. The indirect relative is used to signify a genitive or the object of a preposition. In these cases, there is a resumptive pronoun in the relative clause.
(53a)  "the man whose sister was in the hospital" (lit. "the man that his sister was in the hospital")
(53b)  "the man whose daughter gave him a hundred pounds" or "the man to whom his daughter gave a hundred pounds" (lit. "the man that his daughter gave him a hundred pounds")
(53c)  "the room that I slept in" (lit. "the room that I slept in it")

The negative form of a relative clause, direct or indirect, is formed with the eclipsing relativizer , or, before the preterite, with the leniting relativizer .
(54a)  "That's something I don't understand." (direct)
(54b)  "a woman whose son isn't working" (indirect; lit. "a woman that her son isn't working")

Sometimes a direct relative clause can be ambiguous in meaning, leaving unclear if the relative is accusative or nominative:
(55)  "the priest who kissed the woman" or "the priest whom the woman kissed"
If the accusative reading is intended, one could use an indirect relative with a resumptive pronoun:
(56)  "the priest whom the woman kissed" (lit. "the priest that the woman kissed him")

Wh-questions
A wh-question begins with a word such as "who, what, how, when, where, why" etc. In Irish, such questions are constructed as relative clauses, in that they can be constructed as either direct or indirect.

Direct relative wh-questions
Questions with "who, what, how many, which, when" are constructed as direct relative clauses.
(57a)  "When did it happen?"
(57b)  "Who did it?"
(57c)  "What did you get?"
(57d)  "How many miles did you walk?"
(57e)  "Which is more expensive, meat or fish?"

Indirect relative wh-questions
Questions with prepositions (i.e. "on what?, with whom?") and questions with "why?" and "where?" are constructed as indirect relative clauses.
(58a)  "Who has the money?" (lit. "who at him is the money")
(58b)  "What did you lift the car with?" (lit. "what with it did you lift the car")
(58c)  "Why did you hit him?"
(58d)  "Where did you see the woman?"

Clauses introduced by "how"
There are two words for "how" in Irish: the word  takes the direct relative clause, the phrase  takes the indirect.
(59a)  "How did it happen?"
(59b)  "How does that concern you?/What business is that of yours?"

Complementary subordinate clauses in the form of a relative clause
Some complements in Irish take the form of a relative, in that they end in the relative particle ; both direct and indirect relative are found.

Direct
(60a)  "When I was young, I lived in Donegal."
(60b)  "She will call as soon as she gets home."
(60c)  "He was crying while he was talking to me."
(60d)  "Then a melody was played, as one often did ."
(60e)  "He moved his head as if he were playing music."
(60f)  "You may hold it as long as you are careful with it."

Indirect
(61a)  "Look for them where you put them."
(61b)  "Stay where you are!"
(61c)  "By the time he came, they were all sold out."
(61d)  "I will tell him that as soon as I see him."
(61e)  "She left it as it was."

External links 
 Gramadach na Gaeilge - by Lars Bräsicke

Syntax